Narula Institute of Technology (better known as NiT, Kolkata) is an autonomous private engineering college in West Bengal, India, situated in Agarpara, Kolkata. The college is affiliated with the Maulana Abul Kalam Azad University of Technology (MAKAUT). It is one of seven colleges under the JIS Group, a Sikh minority group and a member of Association of Minority Professional Academic Institutes (AMPAI).

Admission
Admission for BTech. courses is held through WBJEE and JEE Main. Admission for MTech courses is held through GATE and PGET.

Programs
Engineering
 BTech Civil Engineering 
 BTech Computer science and engineering
 BTech Electrical Engineering 
 BTech Electronics and Communication Engineering 
 BTech Electronics and Instrumentation Engineering 
 BTech Information Technology 
 BTech Mechanical Engineering 
 BTech Computer Science and Technology

 MTech Computer science and engineering
 MTech Electronics and Communications engineering
 MTech Power Systems 
 MTech Structural Engineering 

 Diploma in Civil Engineering
Diploma in Mechanical Engineering
 Diploma in Electrical Engineering
 Diploma in Electronics and Communication Engineering
 Diploma in Electronics and Telecommunication Engineering

Computer Application
 BCA 
 MCA

Business Administration
 BBA 
 MBA

Affiliations
The college is affiliated with the Maulana Abul Kalam Azad University of Technology (MAKAUT). It is approved by the All India Council for Technical Education (AICTE) and accredited by the National Assessment and Accreditation Council (NAAC) with a "B" grade until the end of 2019, and maximum courses are National Board of Accreditation (NBA) accredited. It got grade "A" by NAAC in 2022 with the CGPA of 3.22 on 4 point scale.

Rankings

The National Institutional Ranking Framework (NIRF) ranked Narula Institute of Technology in 201-250 band among engineering colleges in India in 2022.

Placement and training
The college has its own P&T cell with dedicated staff. The majority of the placement are categorized under BPO, EPO, and Call center services.

See also

References

External links
 
 

2001 establishments in West Bengal
Educational institutions established in 2001
Colleges affiliated to West Bengal University of Technology
Engineering colleges in Kolkata
Universities and colleges in North 24 Parganas district
Private engineering colleges in India
Articles containing video clips